Hilari Scarl is an American filmmaker who directed and produced the documentary See What I'm Saying: The Deaf Entertainers Documentary (2009), starring Bob Hiltermann, TL Forsberg, CJ Jones and Robert DeMayo. She also produced No Ordinary Hero: The SuperDeafy Movie (2013).

Scarl was one of the 50 filmmakers chosen by Steven Spielberg out of 12,000 directors for his TV show 'On the Lot' on FOX and made it to the final 19.

Scarl is a board member of the Alliance of Women Directors.

Filmography 
List of film from Stage32

References

External links
 

Year of birth missing (living people)
Living people
Deaf film directors
American documentary film producers
American deaf people